Nephesh ( nép̄eš) is a Biblical Hebrew word which occurs in the Hebrew Bible. The word refers to the aspects of sentience, and human beings and other animals are both described as being nephesh. Bugs and plants, as examples of live organisms, are not referred in the Bible as being nephesh. The term  is literally "soul", although it is commonly rendered as "life", "living being" and "creature" in English translations. One view is that nephesh relates to sentient being without the idea of life and that, rather than having a nephesh, a sentient creation of God is a nephesh. In , the text is not that Adam was given a nephesh but that Adam "became a living nephesh."

Biblical use
The word nephesh occurs 754 times in the Hebrew Bible. The first four times nephesh is used in the Bible, it is used exclusively to describe animals:  (sea life),  (great sea life),  (land creatures),  (birds and land creatures). At  nephesh is used as description of man.

 parallels the words רוח (ruah) and נפׁש (nephesh): “In His hand is the life (nephesh) of every living thing and the spirit (ruah) of every human being.” 

The Hebrew term, nephesh chayyah is often translated "living soul". Chayyah alone is often translated living thing or animal.

Often nephesh is used in the context of saving your life, nephesh then is referring to an entire person's life as in Joshua 2:13; Isaiah 44:20; 1 Samuel 19:11; Psalm 6:5; 49:15; 72:13.

In Greek, the word ψυχή (psyche) is the closest equivalent to the Hebrew nephesh. In its turn, the Latin word for ψυχή is anima, etymon of the word animal.

See also
 Human spirit
 Immortality
 On the Soul by Aristotle
 Pikuach nefesh
 Soul in the Bible

References

 Exegetical Dictionary of the New Testament (3 Volume Set), March, 1993, by Horst Balz
  A.B.Davidson (Professor of Hebrew & O.T. exegesis, Edinburgh), The Theology of the Old Testament, Edinburgh: T.& T. Clark, 1904/25, p.200-201

Hebrew words and phrases in the Hebrew Bible
Christian anthropology
Animals in the Bible
Plants in the Bible